Boutalhaya or Boutalhaye is a village and rural commune in the Trarza Region of south-western Mauritania.

In 2000 it had a population of 10,502.

References

Communes of Trarza Region